The 2004–05 season was the 107th season of competitive football played by Arsenal. The club ended the campaign as FA Cup winners, but failed to retain their Premier League title as they finished second to Chelsea. In the UEFA Champions League, Arsenal made an exit in the knockout stages to Bayern Munich.

In the transfer window Arsenal purchased goalkeeper Manuel Almunia, who initially served a backup to Jens Lehmann, and midfielder Mathieu Flamini. The club kept hold of its captain Patrick Vieira after much transfer speculation over his expected move to Real Madrid. Several players left Arsenal before the campaign got under way; defender Martin Keown left to play for Leicester City, Ray Parlour joined Middlesbrough while Sylvain Wiltord signed for Lyon.

Arsenal began the season in good form and equalled Nottingham Forest's unbeaten league run of 42 matches against Middlesbrough. The team set a new English division record and went a further seven games unbeaten before losing to Manchester United in controversial circumstances. Arsenal's form suffered as a result and defensive shortcomings became more apparent; two draws and a defeat in November reinforced Chelsea's position at the top of the table, where they remained for the rest of the season. At home to Crystal Palace in February 2005, Wenger named an Arsenal squad with no English players – a first in the club's history which attracted criticism from the media. The team ended the season strongly, with a run of eight wins from nine games ensuring a second-place finish. 32 different players represented the club in five competitions and there were 15 different goalscorers. Arsenal's top goalscorer was Thierry Henry, who scored 30 goals in 42 games.

Background

Arsenal ended the previous season as league champions, becoming the first side since Preston North End 115 years earlier to do so undefeated. They completed their historic league campaign with 26 wins, 12 draws and 90 points.

By the end of January 2004, Arsenal were still in the hunt for all four trophies, but suffered setbacks in each of the cup competitions; they were unable to retain the FA Cup, losing out to eventual winners Manchester United in the semi-finals and days later were knocked out of the UEFA Champions League by Chelsea in the quarter-finals. They exited the League Cup after a defeat to Middlesbrough in early February.

Transfers
In

Out

Pre-season

FA Community Shield

The 2004 edition of the FA Community Shield, was contested between Manchester United and Arsenal at the Millennium Stadium on 8 August. Cesc Fàbregas started alongside Gilberto Silva in midfield for Arsenal as Vieira was absent, while Thierry Henry partnered Dennis Bergkamp up front. After a goalless first half, Arsenal took the lead when Gilberto scored in the 50th minute. Manchester United equalised through Alan Smith five minutes after, but José Antonio Reyes restored Arsenal's advantage two minutes before the hour mark. Mikaël Silvestre scored an own goal 11 minutes before the end to give Arsenal a 3–1 victory. Wenger praised Fàbregas's performance after the match, describing the midfielder as a "complete player" and reiterated his desire to keep Vieira.

Premier League

A total of 20 teams competed in the Premier League in the 2004–05 season. Each team played 38 matches; two against every other team and one match at each club's stadium. Three points were awarded for each win, one point per draw, and none for defeats. At the end of the season the top two teams qualified for the group stages of the UEFA Champions League; teams in third and fourth needed to play a qualifier. The provisional fixture list was released on 24 June 2004, but was subject to change in the event of clashes with other competitions, international football, inclement weather, or matches being selected for television coverage.

August–October

Arsenal began their defence of the league title against Everton on 15 August 2004. Fàbregas was named in the first eleven; at 17 years 103 days he became the club's youngest ever Premier League player. It was Bergkamp on his 500th league appearance who opened the scoring for Arsenal and Reyes made it 2–0, heading the ball in from Freddie Ljungberg's cross. Ljungberg added a third goal in the second half and in spite of the team conceding moments after, Robert Pires scored Arsenal's fourth in the 83rd minute. Shortly before the kick-off at home to Middlesbrough the following weekend, the club was presented a golden replica of the Premier League trophy, to commemorate their unbeaten season. In the match, Henry gave Arsenal the lead, which was cancelled out before half time by Joseph-Désiré Job's goal-bound effort. Four minutes after the interval, Franck Queudrue exploited an error from defender Pascal Cygan and in turn passed the ball to Jimmy Floyd Hasselbaink, who "finish[ed] with perfect brutality". Queudrue scored to put Middlesbrough 3–1 up in the 53rd minute, but Bergkamp replied with a goal for Arsenal a minute later. The home team completed the comeback with further goals by Reyes, Pires and Henry. Wenger afterwards admitted Arsenal's defending was poor, but said their attacking threat made up for their deficiencies. The 5–3 win meant Arsenal equalled Nottingham Forest's record of 42 league matches undefeated. Three days later, the team beat Blackburn Rovers 3–0 to set a new record. Arsenal at the end of the month travelled to Norwich City, where three first half goals set the team on the way to a 4–1 victory. The win ended Norwich's eight-month undefeated record at Carrow Road.

Due to international fixtures, Arsenal did not play another game for two weeks. On the resumption of club football, they travelled across London to face Fulham. Vieira made his return to the first team in place of Fàbregas. Fulham was awarded a penalty in the first half, after Ashley Cole brought down striker Andy Cole in the penalty area. Referee Mark Halsey however changed his mind after protests from the Arsenal players and a consultation with his assistant; the game was restarted with a dropped-ball. Arsenal scored three times in the second half and ended the weekend of 6 September 2004 top of the league table, two points clear of second place Chelsea. The league champions dropped their first points of the season at home to Bolton Wanderers. At the City of Manchester Stadium on 25 September 2004, a goal by Cole earned Arsenal a 1–0 win against Manchester City. Journalist Russell Thomas, writing for The Guardian, commented on Arsenal's fatigue during the second half and opined that the team needed to keep their focus against sterner opposition.

Arsenal beat Charlton Athletic in early October to extend their unbeaten run to 48 league matches. Charlton manager Alan Curbishley said of his opponents: "The gulf between Arsenal and the rest of the Premier League means that the rest have got it all to do to try and stop them, and I'm including the big three or four." Two goals from Pires and one from Henry ensured a 3–1 win against Aston Villa, who had led the game early on. Attention soon turned to Arsenal's trip to face Manchester United. The champions were looking to go half a century of league games unbeaten, whereas the home team – in transition, attempted to push on for a title challenge. The game saw many late aggressive tackles made by United players go unpunished and later in the match, an attempted challenge by Sol Campbell on Wayne Rooney earned Manchester United a controversial penalty, converted by Ruud van Nistelrooy in the 73rd minute. Rooney then scored United's second goal of the match to end Arsenal's unbeaten run on 49 games. Tempers boiled over in the players' tunnel, where pizza was thrown at Manchester United manager Sir Alex Ferguson. When speaking to the media, a distraught Wenger told reporters that Rooney dived to win the penalty and criticised the refereeing performance of Mike Riley. He was later found guilty of insinuating that Van Nistelrooy was a cheat, and fined £15,000 by the FA.

The final match of October was against Southampton at Highbury. Henry who missed a penalty early on, scored to put Arsenal in front in the 67th minute. Southampton replied with two goals from Rory Delap, but Van Persie in stoppage time equalised for the home team with a curling shot. The draw meant Arsenal stood in first position and had accumulated 26 points. The team were level on points with Chelsea, with a marginally better goal difference.

November–December
For the second league game in succession, Arsenal dropped two points. The team drew 1–1 at Crystal Palace on 6 November 2004, which meant Chelsea overtook them in first position. Wenger rued Arsenal's inability to hold onto leads in matches and admitted the fluency had disappeared in their football, possibly because of the manner  in which they lost the unbeaten record. A week later Arsenal faced Tottenham Hotspur at White Hart Lane. It was Tottenham who began the match the better of the two teams and took the lead after 36 minutes when Noureddine Naybet scored. Henry equalised for Arsenal moments before half-time, and the champions went in front after Lauren converted a penalty. Vieira scored on the hour mark to make it 3–1, before Jermain Defoe replied for Tottenham instantly with a "wonderful, dipping finish into the top corner". Fàbregas created Arsenal's fourth goal, scored by Ljungberg. In the final 16 minutes Tottenham scored twice and Arsenal once; the final score was 5–4, making it the highest scoring North London derby. Arsenal's defending was ridiculed by Chelsea manager José Mourinho, who told reporters, "Five-four is a hockey score, not a football score."

Arsenal only managed a draw against West Bromwich Albion on 20 November 2004; Robert Earnshaw's goal with 11 minutes remaining of normal time cancelled out Pires' opener. Arsenal lost their final match of November, away to Liverpool at Anfield. Vieira finished off a one-touch move to equalise for Arsenal – who were behind in the first half – but Neil Mellor scored the winning goal of the game, shooting from long range. Football pundit Alan Hansen in his analysis on Match of the Day criticised the temperament of Arsenal's players and questioned their desire: "When you have success, sometimes it isn't there and you have to dig in with great determination and hard work, and at the moment they are not doing that. When you look at their two big players, Henry and Vieira, [you think they] must do better in future." Arsenal ended the month in second, five points behind leaders Chelsea.

Henry scored two late goals in Arsenal's victory over Birmingham City on 4 December 2004. Wenger replaced Lehmann in goal with Almunia, who made his league debut. Arsenal then faced league leaders Chelsea at Highbury; the match was billed as "Judgement Day" by Sky Sports. With Vieira suspended and Gilberto and Edu injured, Wenger picked Flamini to partner Fabregas in midfield. The first chance of the match went to Henry, who scored inside 75 seconds. John Terry levelled the score, but Henry restored Arsenal's lead from a contentious free-kick – Graham Poll allowed the striker to take it quickly without warning the Chelsea players. Eiður Guðjohnsen equalised early in the second half for Chelsea, and late on Henry missed a chance to score a hat-trick. There were no further goals and the match ended 2–2, meaning Chelsea remained five points clear of Arsenal. Wenger said he was disappointed in the manner his team conceded to Chelsea – from two set pieces, but added, "I thought we did really well, and it was important for us to come back to the level we want to be at."

Arsenal won their remaining games in December and conceded no goals. They beat Portsmouth courtesy of a Campbell goal in the second half, and on Boxing Day defeated Fulham by two goals. Vieira scored the winning goal against Newcastle United, a volley that deflected over goalkeeper Shay Given. After 20 games, Arsenal accumulated 44 points and lay second in the league table.

January–February
On New Year's Day, Ljungberg scored two goals in Arsenal's 3–1 win against Charlton Athletic. The team four days later drew at home to Manchester City. Arsenal lost further ground to Chelsea after defeat to Bolton Wanderers at the Reebok Stadium. Wenger conceded that Chelsea were favourites to win the league because of their point advantage, but added: "We will keep going and fight until the last minute of the championship." Arsenal ended January with a 1–0 home win against Newcastle United. Wenger made four changes from the Bolton defeat, with Bergkamp the match scorer coming in place of Van Persie.

The first night of February saw Arsenal host Manchester United at Highbury. In the tunnel before the match Roy Keane was seen confronting Vieira; the United captain accused him of intimidating his teammate Gary Neville. Vieira scored after eight minutes, but Giggs equalised for Manchester United 10 minutes later. Bergkamp restored Arsenal's advantage nine minutes before half time, but two goals by Cristiano Ronaldo and one by John O'Shea in the second half gave United a 4–2 win. It was Arsenal's fourth league defeat of the season and moved them down to third spot, overtaken by their opponents. Wenger ruled his team out of the title race and refused to blame Almunia for his error in Ronaldo's first goal. The goalkeeper was dropped in Arsenal's next game, away to Aston Villa. Three first half goals by Ljungberg, Henry and Cole gave Arsenal a comfortable win.

For the match against Crystal Palace on 14 February 2005, Wenger named an Arsenal squad that did not feature a single British player – a first in the club's history. The team did not get off to the best of starts with Lehmann miskicking a back pass and Vieira losing possession routinely, but grew as the game went on and scored three goals in seven minutes. On his 200th league appearance, Henry scored in either half, with the result 5–1 to Arsenal. The result was somewhat overshadowed by the foreign makeup of the team; former player Paul Merson called it a "joke" and PFA chairman Gordon Taylor noted it was a "worrying pattern for English football". When asked about his team selections, Wenger said: "I don't look at the passport of people, I look at their quality and their attitude."

Arsenal only earned a point at Southampton, where Van Persie was sent off for a late challenge on Graeme Le Saux. The team remained in third at the end of February, four points behind Manchester United and 10 behind leaders Chelsea, who played a game less than both challengers.

March–May
Arsenal's form improved as the season drew to a close. At home to Portsmouth on 5 March 2005, the team earned three points courtesy of Henry's hat-trick. Van Persie scored the only goal in Arsenal's match against Blackburn Rovers and the team moved back to second position with a home win against Norwich City – Henry scored another hat-trick. A week later Pires' goal was enough for Arsenal to beat Middlesbrough at the Riverside Stadium and win their fourth consecutive match. The team then played out a goalless draw against Chelsea, who were on course to become champions; Wenger congratulated his opponents on their season and felt Arsenal needed to score first so that they could "force them to come out from the back."

Arsenal defeated Tottenham 1–0 on 25 April 2005, which meant Chelsea needed to wait on Saturday in order to mathematically win the title. Second position was the best Arsenal could aim for by the time they faced West Bromwich Albion on 2 May 2005. Goals from Van Persie and Edu earned a 2–0 win for the team and Arsenal beat Champions League finalists Liverpool at Highbury to all-but secure second spot. Arsenal recorded the biggest win of the league season, against Everton at Highbury. An inspired performance by Bergkamp helped the team win 7–0; he created the opening two goals and scored in the second half. Arsenal lost their final game of the campaign, away to Birmingham City. It was a lacklustre performance by the visitors, who equalised through Bergkamp after going a goal behind, but conceded in the 90th minute.

Matches

Classification

Results summary

Results by round

FA Cup

Arsenal entered the competition in the third round, by virtue of their Premier League status. Their opening match was a home tie against Stoke City. The visitors took the lead just before the break, but goals from Reyes and Van Persie in the second half meant Arsenal won 2–1. They then faced Wolverhampton Wanderers at home in the next round; a goal apiece from Vieira and Ljungberg secured a comfortable 2–0 victory.

Arsenal's opponent in the fifth round was Sheffield United. After 35 minutes Bergkamp was sent off for his apparent push on Cullip. With eleven minutes of normal time remaining, Robert Pires scored for Arsenal, but the team conceded a late penalty which Andy Gray converted. The equaliser for Sheffield United meant the match was replayed at Bramall Lane on 1 March 2005. Both teams played out a goalless draw after full-time and throughout extra-time, so the tie was decided by a penalty shootout. Almunia saved two penalties, which ensured progress into the quarter-finals.

Bolton Wanderers hosted Arsenal at the Reebok Stadium in the sixth round of the competition. Ljungberg scored the only goal of the tie after just three minutes; he had an opportunity to extend Arsenal's lead in stoppage time, but hit the ball over from six yards. Arsenal faced Blackburn Rovers in the semi-final which was played at the Millennium Stadium. Two goals from Van Persie and one from Pires gave Arsenal a 3–0 win, in a match marred by Blackburn's aggressive tactics.

This set up a showdown with Manchester United in the final on 21 May 2005. United were on top for long periods of the game but Arsenal resisted their pressure and the match ended 0–0 after 120 minutes, albeit Arsenal were a man lighter after Reyes' dismissal with a minute remaining for two bookable offences. The match went to penalties with all the penalty takers converting barring Paul Scholes, whose effort was denied by Lehmann. Vieira converted the final and winning spot-kick to seal a tenth FA Cup crown for Arsenal.

Football League Cup

The Football League Cup is a cup competition open to clubs in the Premier League and Football League. Like the FA Cup it is played on a knockout basis, with the exception of the second round and semi-finals, which are contested over a two-legged tie. Together with the other clubs playing in European competitions, Arsenal entered the Football League Cup in the third round. The team were drawn to face Manchester City, on the week of 25 October 2004. Wenger fielded a relatively young team for the tie, which took the lead in the second half when Van Persie scored. Danny Karbassiyoon extended the visitor's lead in the 90th minute, just before Manchester City striker Robbie Fowler scored from a free-kick.

In the fourth round, Arsenal faced Everton at Highbury. The team went behind after eight minutes of play, but Quincy Owusu-Abeyie levelled the scoreline and in the second half Arturo Lupoli scored twice. Wenger was pleased with how his team responded to the setback and added: "They played intelligently, technically well and with the spirit we like to play the game." Arsenal bowed out of the competition away to Manchester United; the only goal of the match came inside 19 seconds when David Bellion profited from an error by goalkeeper Almunia.

UEFA Champions League

Group stage

Arsenal were drawn in Group E, along with Dutch champions PSV, Greek club Panathinaikos and Norwegian side Rosenborg. An Alex own goal was enough for Arsenal to claim three points against PSV on the first matchday. The team drew away to Rosenborg and earned a point at Panathinaikos, despite twice having taken the lead at the Apostolos Nikolaidis Stadium. In the reverse fixture, Cygan scored an own goal to cancel out Henry's first-half opener; the result left Arsenal in second position. Their next match was against PSV at the Philips Stadion, where after eight minutes the home side took the lead. Henry equalised for Arsenal, having created the chance following a one-two with Ljungberg. In the second half Lauren and Vieira were both sent off, for two bookable offences. Wenger accepted referee Herbert Fandel's decision, but added his surprise that Mark van Bommel was not cautioned: "If you look at the number of fouls he made without being punished it is very surprising because he made some deliberate fouls. Some people might criticise Patrick when we were down to 10 men but he felt he had to fight harder to win the ball."

The draw against PSV meant Arsenal had to beat against Rosenborg to qualify for the last 16. A 5–1 win at home, with five different goalscorers on the scoresheet, put Arsenal top of the group given PSV lost to Panathinaikos.

Knockout phase

Round of 16
Arsenal were drawn against Bayern Munich in the knockout stages. In the first leg a mistake from Touré presented Claudio Pizarro to score inside four minutes. The striker then scored his second of the match in the 58th minute, getting past his marker Touré, and Hasan Salihamidžić added a third for Bayern seven minutes later. Touré scored an away goal late on for Arsenal, which gave them a slender chance of progressing into the quarter-finals. Arsenal beat Bayern in the second leg, but a solitary goal – scored by Henry in the 66th minute, meant the club was eliminated.

Player statistics
Arsenal used a total of 32 players during the 2004–05 season and there were 18 different goalscorers. There were also three squad members who did not make a first-team appearance in the campaign. The team played in a 4–4–2 formation throughout the season, but Wenger deployed a 4–5–1 formation for the cup final. Touré featured in 49 matches – the most of any Arsenal player in the campaign.

The team scored a total of 117 goals in all competitions. The highest scorer was Henry, with 30 goals, followed by Pires who scored 17 goals. Five Arsenal players were sent off during the season: Vieira, Reyes, Bergkamp, Van Persie and Lauren.

Key

No. = Squad number

Pos = Playing position

Nat. = Nationality

Apps = Appearances

GK = Goalkeeper

DF = Defender

MF = Midfielder

FW = Forward

 = Yellow cards

 = Red cards

Numbers in parentheses denote appearances as substitute. Players with number struck through and marked  left the club during the playing season.

Source:

See also

 2004-05 in English football

References

Arsenal F.C. seasons
Arsenal